Axiom is a free, general-purpose computer algebra system.  It consists of an interpreter environment, a compiler and a library, which defines a strongly typed hierarchy.

History 
Two computer algebra systems named Scratchpad were developed by IBM. The first one was started in 1965 by James Griesmer at the request of Ralph Gomory, and written in Fortran. The development of this software was stopped before any public release. The second Scratchpad, originally named Scratchpad II, was developed from 1977 on, at Thomas J. Watson Research Center, under the direction of Richard Dimick Jenks.

The design is principally due to Richard D. Jenks (IBM Research), James H. Davenport (University of Bath), Barry M. Trager (IBM Research), David Y.Y. Yun (Southern Methodist University) and Victor S. Miller (IBM Research). Early consultants on the project were David Barton (University of California, Berkeley) and James W. Thatcher (IBM Research). Implementation included Robert Sutor (IBM Research), Scott C. Morrison (University of California, Berkeley), Christine J. Sundaresan (IBM Research), Timothy Daly (IBM Research), Patrizia Gianni (University of Pisa), Albrecht Fortenbacher (Universitaet Karlsruhe), Stephen M. Watt (IBM Research and University of Waterloo), Josh Cohen (Yale University), Michael Rothstein (Kent State University), Manuel Bronstein (IBM Research), Michael Monagan (Simon Fraser University), Jonathon Steinbach (IBM Research), William Burge (IBM Research), Jim Wen (IBM Research), William Sit (City College of New York), and Clifton Williamson (IBM Research)

Scratchpad II was renamed Axiom when IBM decided, circa 1990, to make it a commercial product. A few years later, it was sold to NAG. In 2001, it was withdrawn from the market and re-released under the Modified BSD License. Since then, the project's lead developer has been Tim Daly.

In 2007, Axiom was forked twice, originating two different open-source projects: OpenAxiom and FriCAS, following "serious disagreement about project goals". The Axiom project continued to be developed by Tim Daly.

The current research direction is "Proving Axiom Sane", that is, logical, rational, judicious, and sound.

Documentation 

Axiom is a literate program. The source code is becoming available in a set of volumes which are available on the axiom-developer.org website. These volumes contain the actual source code of the system.

The currently available documents are:
 Combined Table of Contents
 Volume 0: Axiom Jenks and Sutor—The main textbook
 Volume 1: Axiom Tutorial—A simple introduction
 Volume 2: Axiom Users Guide—Detailed examples of domain use (incomplete)
 Volume 3: Axiom Programmers Guide—Guided examples of program writing (incomplete)
 Volume 4: Axiom Developers Guide—Short essays on developer-specific topics (incomplete)
 Volume 5: Axiom Interpreter—Source code for Axiom interpreter (incomplete)
 Volume 6: Axiom Command—Source code for system commands and scripts (incomplete)
 Volume 7: Axiom Hyperdoc—Source code and explanation of X11 Hyperdoc help browser
 Volume 7.1 Axiom Hyperdoc Pages—Source code for Hyperdoc pages
 Volume 8: Axiom Graphics—Source code for X11 Graphics subsystem
 Volume 8.1 Axiom Gallery—A Gallery of Axiom images
 Volume 9: Axiom Compiler—Source code for Spad compiler (incomplete)
 Volume 10: Axiom Algebra Implementation—Essays on implementation issues (incomplete)
 Volume 10.1: Axiom Algebra Theory—Essays containing background theory
 Volume 10.2: Axiom Algebra Categories—Source code for Axiom categories
 Volume 10.3: Axiom Algebra Domains—Source code for Axiom domains
 Volume 10.4: Axiom Algebra Packages—Source code for Axiom packages
 Volume 10.5: Axiom Algebra Numerics—Source code for Axiom numerics
 Volume 11: Axiom Browser—Source pages for Axiom Firefox browser front end
 Volume 12: Axiom Crystal—Source code for Axiom Crystal front end (incomplete)
 Volume 13: Proving Axiom Correct—Prove Axiom Algebra (incomplete)
 Volume 15: The Axiom SANE Compiler
 Bibliography: Axiom Bibliography—Literature references
 Bug List: Axiom Bug List-Bug List
 Reference Card: Axiom Reference Card—Useful function summary

Videos 

The Axiom project has a major focus on providing documentation. Recently the project announced the first in a series of instructional videos, which are also available on the axiom-developer.org website. The first video provides details on the Axiom information sources.

Philosophy 

The Axiom project focuses on the “30 Year Horizon”. The primary philosophy is that Axiom needs to develop several fundamental features in order to be useful to the next generation of computational mathematicians. Knuth's literate programming technique is used throughout the source code. Axiom plans to use proof technology to prove the correctness of the algorithms (such as Coq and ACL2).

Axiom uses Docker Containers as part of a continuous release process. The latest image is available on any platform using docker and the commands:

docker pull daly/axiom

docker run -i -t daly/axiom axiom

Design 

In Axiom, each object has a type. Examples of types are mathematical structures (such as rings, fields, polynomials) as well as data structures from computer science (e.g., lists, trees, hash tables).

A function can take a type as argument, and its return value can also be a type. For example, Fraction is a function, that takes an IntegralDomain as argument, and returns the field of fractions of its argument. As another example, the ring of  matrices with rational entries would be constructed as SquareMatrix(4, Fraction Integer). Of course, when working in this domain, 1 is interpreted as the identity matrix and A^-1 would give the inverse of the matrix A, if it exists.

Several operations can have the same name, and the types of both the arguments and the result are used to determine which operation is applied (cf. function overloading).

Axiom comes with an extension language called SPAD. All the mathematical knowledge of Axiom is written in this language. The interpreter accepts roughly the same language.

Features 

Within the interpreter environment, Axiom uses type inference and a heuristic algorithm to make explicit type annotations mostly unnecessary.

It features 'HyperDoc', an interactive browser-like help system, and can display two and three dimensional graphics, also providing interactive features like rotation and lighting. It also has a specialized interaction mode for Emacs, as well as a plugin for the TeXmacs editor.

Axiom has an implementation of the Risch algorithm for elementary integration, which was done by Manuel Bronstein and Barry Trager. While this implementation can find most elementary antiderivatives and whether they exist, it does have some non-implemented branches, and raises an error when such cases are encountered during integration.

See also 

 A# programming language
 Aldor programming language
 List of computer algebra systems

References

Further reading 

 
 
 
 
 
 
 
 
 
 
 
 
 
 
 
 
 
 
 
 
 
 
 
 
 
 
 
 
 Timothy Daly "Axiom -- Thirty Years of Lisp"
 Timothy Daly "Axiom" Invited Talk, Free Software Conference, Lyon, France, May, 2002
 Timothy Daly "Axiom" Invited Talk, Libre Software Meeting, Metz, France, July 9–12, 2003

External links 

 Axiom Homepage
 Online sandbox to try Axiom
 Source code repositories: Github, SourceForge, GNU Savannah
 Jenks, R.D. and Sutor, R. "Axiom, The Scientific Computation System"
 Daly, T. "Axiom Volume 1: Tutorial"

Software forks:
 OpenAxiom (SourceForge)
 FriCAS (SourceForge)

Common Lisp (programming language) software
Computer algebra system software for Linux
Free computer algebra systems
Free software programmed in Lisp